Daniel Graf (born 7 September 1981) is a former German biathlete. He competes in the Biathlon World Cup.

Biathlon results
All results are sourced from the International Biathlon Union.

World Championships

World Cup

Podiums

*Results are from IBU races which include the Biathlon World Cup, Biathlon World Championships and the Winter Olympic Games.

Updated on 17 January 2019

References

External links

1981 births
Living people
German male biathletes
People from Arnstadt
Sportspeople from Thuringia